Karl Feller (1 December 1898 – 1991) was an Austrian footballer. He played in two matches for the Austria national football team in 1918.

References

External links
 

1898 births
1991 deaths
Austrian footballers
Austria international footballers
Place of birth missing
Association footballers not categorized by position